Sanford Zangwill Kaye "Sandy" Hampton is a bishop of The Episcopal Church, serving in Minnesota and Oregon.

References 

Religious leaders from Oregon
Episcopal bishops of Olympia